Body Bags may refer to:

Body Bags (film), a 1993 horror / thriller TV movie directed by John Carpenter and Tobe Hooper
Body Bags (soundtrack), a soundtrack album from the film
Body Bags (comics), a comic book series created, written and illustrated by Jason Pearson
"Body Bags" (song), a song by rapper The Game
Body Bags (novel), a 1999 novel by Christopher Golden